Taldycupedidae is an extinct family of beetles primarily known from the Permian period.

Taxonomy
Kirejtshuk (2020) included the following genera in Taldycupedidae, preliminarily treating it as a subfamily Taldycupedinae of the family Permocupedidae.

 Afrotaldycupes  Beaufort Group, South Africa, Late Permian (Changhsingian)
 Afrotaldycupes africanus  (Type species)
 Afrotaldycupes lidgettoniensis 
 Mesothoris  Blackstone Formation, Australia Late Triassic (Norian)
 Mesothoris clathrata  (Type species)
 Mesothoris grandis 
 Mesothoris punctomarginum 
 Proterocupes  (syn Lobanovia )
 Proterocupes major  Vokhma Formation, Vologda, Russia, Late Permian (Changhsingian)
 Proterocupes nedubrovensis   Vokhma Formation, Vologda, Russia, Late Permian (Changhsingian)
 Proterocupes permiana  (Type species) Poldarsa Formation, Vologda, Russia, Late Permian (Wuchiapingian)
 Simmondsia  Blackstone Formation, Australia Late Triassic (Norian)
 Simmondsia cylindrica 
 Simmondsia subpiriformis  (Type species)
 Taldycupes  (syn Cryptocupes , Taldycupidium )
 Taldycupes bergi  Gramoteinskaya Formation, Kemerovo Oblast, Russia, Late Permian
 Taldycupes cellulosus  Poldarsa Formation, Vologda, Russia, Late Permian (Wuchiapingian)
 Taldycupes khalfini  (Type species) Gramoteinskaya Formation, Kemerovo Oblast, Russia, Late Permian
 Taldycupes moltshanovi  Gramoteinskaya Formation, Kemerovo Oblast, Russia, Late Permian
 Taldycupes pingi  Yinping Formation, Anhui, China, Middle Permian (Capitanian)
 Taldycupes reticulatus  Akkolka Formation, Kazakhstan, Late Permian (Changhsingian)
 Taldycupes rosanovi  Limptekon Formation, Krasnoyarsk, Russia, Late Permian (Changhsingian)
 Taldycupes vasjuchitshevi  Gramoteinskaya Formation, Kemerovo Oblast, Russia, Late Permian
 Tecticupes  (syn Stegocupes 
 Tecticupes heckeri  (Type species) Kazankovo-Markinskaya Formation, Kemerovo, Russia, Middle Permian (Wordian) Mitina Formation, Kemerovo, Russia, Middle Permian (Roadian)
 Tecticupes indistinctus  Kazankovo-Markinskaya Formation, Kemerovo, Russia, Middle Permian (Wordian)
 Tecticupes martynovi  Amanak Formation.  Orenburg, Middle Permian (Capitanian)
 Tychticupes  Gramoteinskaya Formation, Kemerovo Oblast, Russia, Late Permian
 Tychticupes beljanini 
 Tychticupes radtshenkoi  (Type species)
 Tychticupes ragozini 
 "Tychticupes ussovi"  (nomen dubium)
 Tychticupoides  Gramoteinskaya Formation, Kemerovo Oblast, Russia, Late Permian
 Tychticupoides grjazevi  (Type species)
 Uskaticupes  (nomen dubium) Gramoteinskaya Formation, Kemerovo Oblast, Russia, Late Permian
 Uskaticupes javorskyi  (nomen dubium)

The genera Alveolacupes , Clathropenna  and Penecupes  were previously placed in the family by some authors, but were all excluded from it by Kirejtshuk (2020). The genera Wuchangia  and Yuxianocoleus , both from the Lower Jurassic of Hubei, China, were also excluded from the family by Zhao et al. (2021) (as the subfamily Taldycupedinae).

References

Permocupedoidea
Permian insects
Taxa named by Boris Rohdendorf
Beetle families
Prehistoric insect families